Malindi Fickle  is an actor/director who was based out of New York City but now resides in Honolulu, HI. She attended New York University, where she graduated summa cum laude in 2002. She got her start in acting in an indie film called "Eyes of the Prey" and eventually made the transition into directing in 2006 with "By The People".

Early life
Malindi cites her favourite film being as Paper Moon (film) but only after she worked on her film "Suck it Up Buttercup" as she was able to look back on it when she first saw it at the age of 9 with her father and get a better understand of the film itself and why her father had allowed her to watch it.

Career

Theatre

Malindi started out in the New York theatre scene where she was a director and actor.

Acting

She got her training at "The School for Film & Television" and "Michael Howard Studios" for acting. She got her first part in Eyes of the Prey by playing an extra in the courtroom scenes of the film. She got her first lead when she played Megan in Jacklight. She continued to star in movies such as Everything Relative (as Candy) and St. Andrew's Girls (as Jennifer) before making her way into directing.

Directing

Her first attempt at directing was with the film "By the People", a film about keeping democracy alive which was shown nationwide on PBS.  She created the company Hyperbaric Productions in order to produce it. Her next project was "Suck it Up Buttercup" which was released in 2014 and is about drug addiction. Unlike her previous film, which was a documentary, this one was in the genre of drama. The shooting of "Suck it Up Buttercup" happened over 28 days but took over 2 years of editing to get it to where she felt comfortable with the finished product.

Education
Attended New York University, where she graduated summa cum laude in 2002.

Personal life
Malindi Fickle currently resides in Honolulu, HI with her family. She has also lived in New York City, where she also based her company out of while there and also lived in Tokyo, on two separate occasions. She was also able to get her start in New York City when she was there by breaking into theatre.

She is married to Jason Brand, president in Tokyo of Merrill Lynch Pacific Rim and has 3 children with him.

She created Hyperbaric Productions in order to help produce films in which she wanted to create.

Filmography

Her Films

By The People (2006)
The film "By The People" takes an inside look into the elections that were held in 2004 in the United States. This election was held between the Democratic representative John Kerry and Republican George W. Bush The film was released in 2006, two years after the elections. There was an even more closer look at this election because of the 2000 chad controversy which plagued the balloting in which numerous ballots needed to be thrown out because of voting machines not recording the votes correctly.

Suck it Up Buttercup (2014)
Malindi Fickle's second attempt at directing was a film about the addiction to prescription pills. It follows a former honor student whose addiction hurts her relationship with her friends and tears her family apart. It differs from her first attempt at directing which was "By The People", which was a documentary, to a drama which needed a more hands on approach with the actors. It has been shown at multiple film festivals including WILLiFEST of last year.

Film Festivals
Malindi is no stranger to the idea of film festivals having been in a film that was shown at Sundance ("Everything Relative") and her latest film ("Suck it Up Buttercup") which was shown at Beaufort International Film Festival. Lacy Marie Meyer, who starred in "Suck it Up Buttercup" won the Best Actress Award at the Beaufort International Film Festival, where she thanked Malindi and praised her work.

Awards and honors
Graduated summa cum laude from New York University in 2002.

Has been nominated in the Hoboken International Film Festival in the categories of "Best Feature Film", "Best of the Festival - Jury Award", "Best of the Festival– Audience Award", "Best Screenplay" and "Best Director" while only winning "Best of the Festival– Jury Award".

Acted in "Everything Relative" which was shown at Sundance Film Festival in 1996.

While her film "Suck it Up Buttercup" was nominated several times in the "Martial Arts Entertainment Action on Film Awards" it was only Malindi herself who won "Best Female Filmmaker – Short or Feature".

She's been critically acclaimed in The New York Times

Social media
Malindi Fickle is active on Twitter (@MalindiFickle) and other social media sites where she promotes her own work and as well works and discussions of other female directors and workers in the entertainment industry. She uses her Twitter to promote many indie films which is where she got her start in acting. She also shows off many other female directors and where to see their works which help out the other females in the industry.

References

External links

Malindi Fickle Twitter

American film directors
American film producers
American actresses
Living people
Year of birth missing (living people)
American women film producers
21st-century American women